Steber is a surname. Notable people with the surname include:

 Eleanor Steber (1914–1990), American operatic soprano
 John Steber (1923–1975), American football player
 Maggie Steber, American documentary photographer

See also
 Stebe